Gary McKinnon (born 3 June 1963) is a South African cricketer. He played in one first-class and seven List A matches for Border from 1989/90 to 1991/92.

See also
 List of Border representative cricketers

References

External links
 

1963 births
Living people
South African cricketers
Border cricketers
Eastern Province cricketers
Cricketers from Port Elizabeth